Arthur Dale LRIBA (1859-1931) was an English architect based in Nottingham.

Career
He was born in Leicester in 1859 the son of James Mee Dale and Ann.

He was articled to William Millican and then remained as his assistant. From 1883 he was assistant to James Tait in the Leicester Borough Surveyor's Office and in 1889 he moved to the Nottingham City Engineers’ Department. He was appointed assistant City Architect in 1901.

In 1910 he was appointed as Licentiate of the Royal Institute of British Architects.

In 1912 he was appointed Nottingham City Architect in succession to Frank Beckett Lewis on a salary of £450 per annum. He held this position until 1927 when he was succeeded by Thomas Cecil Howitt.

He took his own life on 1 October 1931 having suffered from a long illness.

Notable works

References

1859 births
1931 deaths
Architects from Leicester
1931 suicides
Suicides in the United Kingdom